The Cathcart Circle Lines form a mostly suburban railway route linking Glasgow (Central) to Cathcart via a circular line, with branches to Newton and Neilston, on the south bank of the River Clyde. They are part of the Strathclyde Partnership for Transport network.

History 
The lines were built by the Cathcart District Railway (Cathcart Circle) and the Lanarkshire and Ayrshire Railway (Newton and Neilston lines). The first part opened on 1 March 1886 as a double line from Glasgow Central to  then single to Cathcart, doubled on 26 May 1886. The circular route back to Central station via Shawlands and Maxwell Park was completed on 2 April 1894.

The Newton and Neilston branches were built to provide a through route from the Lanarkshire coalfields to ports such as Ardrossan on the Ayrshire coast. There is still a junction with other lines at Newton, but the track beyond Neilston has been lifted.

The lines originally carried significant amounts of freight, but commuter trains are the only regular users now.

When the lines were built much of the land around them was open countryside. The existence of a commuter railway was a major factor in the development of Glasgow's southern suburbs, although until electrification in 1962 there was virtually no passenger service beyond Kirkhill by this route.

On weekdays the services have provided a vital transport link for school pupils and college students at nearby schools and higher education establishments, contributing to passenger numbers on top of the commuter traffic.

The "Blue Trains",  units, which had dual voltage capability, replaced steam trains and early diesel units.

There was a trial run on the previous day, with over 5,500 passengers reported as using the new trains in their first morning rush hour.

Most of the track consists of Jointed Rail

Constituent lines 

The lines comprise the following lines:

Cathcart Circle 
Built by the Cathcart District Railway.

Newton Line 
Built by the Lanarkshire and Ayrshire Railway. The link at Cathcart South junction was put in place during electrification.

Neilston Line 
Built by the L&AR.

Passenger services

Following electrification in 1962 
East side services ran to Newton, with many extended to  via the Clydesdale Junction Railway.

The basic service every 30 minutes was Glasgow Central to Neilston via Mount Florida; Central to Motherwell via Mount Florida; Glasgow Central to Kirkhill via Maxwell Park; and Cathcart Circle (Inner and Outer).

West Coast Main Line electrification 1974 
This included the Hamilton Circle and resulted in east side services terminating at Newton. Peak services from east and west sides operated to Motherwell via Blantyre and Hamilton.

Argyle Line opening in 1979 
The major change being the extension of west side services from Kirkhill to Newton.

Until May 1984 there were four trains an hour on the Newton branch (two via Maxwell Park and two via Queen's Park) and two trains an hour in each direction around the Circle, in addition to the services on the Neilston branch.
From May 1984, both the Newton and Neilston services remained 2 per hour, none turned back at Kirkhill and only one ran the full circle each way.

2006/07 
Services were operated by First ScotRail, with most services using  electric multiple units, although Class 318s and Class 334s (Juniper units) made occasional appearances on the line.

2014 
The basic service (Monday to Sunday) is every 30 minutes from Glasgow Central to Neilston via Mount Florida and every hour from Glasgow Central to Newton via Mount Florida, Glasgow Central to Newton via Maxwell Park and the inner and outer Circle service (does not operate on Sundays).

This frequency gives a 30-minute service on the west side of the Circle, Neilston and Newton branches, three trains per hour at Cathcart and four trains per hour between Glasgow Central and Mount Florida. These service levels are less than those of the 1960s.

At peak times the above services combine to have trains running approximately every 5–10 minutes between Glasgow Central and Cathcart, where line capacity permits. Several trains are formed of the maximum six cars at these times. Commuter levels on this line are quite high and therefore a high density service is required at such busy periods.

2022/23 

The line now features a number of different services, however these are considerably reduced from pre-coronavirus levels. Basic service levels (Monday to Sunday, off-peak) give 2 trains per hour between Glasgow Central and Neilston, 1 train per hour between Newton and Glasgow Central via Maxwell Park and 1 train per hour between Newton and Glasgow Central via Crosshill. There are currently only 6 trains per day which operate the circular service, with none operating on a Saturday or Sunday. These 6 services are peak only, with 3 operating during the morning peak and 3 during the evening peak. In the morning peak, 2 of these services operate clockwise and the other operates anti-clockwise and in the evening peak all 3 services operate anti-clockwise.

Current service patterns combine to give 3 trains per hour between Glasgow Central and Mount Florida and just 1 train per hour between Glasgow Central and Langside. In addition to the regular off-peak service patterns, the branch to Neilston also receives an express service once per day during peak hours. In the morning peak, the 08:08 service will depart Neilston and call at all stops until Muirend, from here the service will operate non-stop to Glasgow Central.

In terms of rolling stock, the line now sees service from the Class 318, Class 320 and Class 380. The Class 380 is most often seen on the line outside of the peak, whilst the Class 320 and 318 units are usually found in the peak and tend to double up to form 6 car consists due to the higher demand at these times.

Rolling stock 

Upon electrification in 1962, Class 303s. Following electrification of the Inverclyde Line in 1967, Class 311 units were also used. Following the introduction of the Class 318 in 1986, they made occasional trips onto the Circle. The Class 311 were withdrawn in 1990, and following the introduction of the  the Class 303 were withdrawn in 2002 and a major redeployment of the fleet took place, resulting in the Class 314s taking over the line, supplemented occasionally by Classes 318 and 334.

In 2014 Class 314s primarily operated the Circle (including Newton, Neilston services). During peak hours Class 380s are also used on the Circle route only.

From December 2016, Class 320s were introduced to the line, working the Circle and Newton via Maxwell Park routes to permit an increase in Class 314 workings on the Inverclyde Line. This was due to a number of Class 380s being reserved for driver training on the newly electrified Glasgow to Edinburgh via Falkirk High route. From the December 2018 timetable change, Class 380s began operating most Neilston services, along with some Circle an Newton services. From February 2019, Class 385s began operating some Circle and Newton services.

Future

Light rail conversion 
There have also been proposals to convert the lines to a tram line, but never beyond the initial suggestion stage. Most recently, in December 2008 Transport Scotland's Strategic Transport Projects Review suggested an upgrade of the Circle to light rail as part of a wider light rail network for Glasgow, incorporating both new lines and re-purposed older alignments. If taken forward, this proposal was supposed to have been implemented during the period 2012 - 2022, in line with the scope of the strategic review.

Glasgow Metro 
The Cathcart Circle has been identified as one of the heavy rail lines that would be converted to metro as part of the proposals for the Glasgow Metro project. No timescale or budget has been released so far, but it is anticipated that it would be one of the first metro lines given that most of the infrastructure is already in place.

References

Notes

Sources

External links
 Origins and History of Cathcart Circle railway line

Transport in Glasgow
Transport in East Renfrewshire
Railway lines in Scotland
Standard gauge railways in Scotland
Railway lines opened in 1886
Pollokshields